Elections to Rugby Borough Council were held on 6 May 1999. One third of the council seats were up for election.  The council stayed under no overall control.  The number of councillors for each party after the election were Labour 22, Conservative 11, Liberal Democrat 7, Residents 4 and Independent 4.

Election result

|}

References

1999 English local elections
1999
20th century in Warwickshire